Léocadia (Time Remembered) is a play by Jean Anouilh that premiered at the Théâtre de la Michodière in Paris on 2 December 1940. For the occasion, Francis Poulenc composed one of his most celebrated songs, "Les Chemins de l'amour", sung by Yvonne Printemps.

Plot 
Léocadia tells the story of a young prince madly in love with a Romanian opera singer, Léocadia Gardi. The young man only knew her for three days: like Isadora Duncan, she died strangled by her shawl. Inconsolable, he lives in his memory of the young woman.

His aunt—the Duchesse d'Andinet d'Andaine—reconstructs the setting and places of those three days like a theater director. Actors play the parts of the butler and servants during those days of happiness. Amanda, a poor milliner and look-alike of the singer, is called upon to seduce the prince, in the hope that life will prevail over memory.

At first, the young man clings desperately to his dream, but eventually comes to realize through Amanda that his memory of Léocadia corresponds to his fear of life being so ephemeral. His anguish at leaving an illusory memory yields soon to the call of real life. The rigid, theatrical world imagined by the duchess falls apart, becoming a false comedy. The prince leaves his illusions and discovers that Léocadia was only an ideal, devoid of substance. His love of Amanda helps him return to real life.

Premiere cast 
 Yvonne Printemps: Amanda
 Pierre Fresnay: The Prince
 Marguerite Deval: The  Duchess
 Victor Boucher: The Butler
 in minor roles: Paul Demange, Léon Larive, Mercédès Brare, Henri-Richard, Jacques Januar and Henry Gaultier
 Director: André Barsacq
 Music: Francis Poulenc
 Premiere: 2 December 1940
 Closed after 173 performances on 27 April 1941

Translation and adaption 
Patricia Moyes translated the play to English, using the title Time Remembered. It was staged both in London and on Broadway in 1957, with Richard Burton and Helen Hayes in the leading parts. In 2000, Jeffrey Hatcher wrote an adaption of the play in English, calling it To Fool the Eye.

Reprise 
Comédie des Champs-Élysées in 1984
 Sabine Haudepin: Amanda
 Lambert Wilson: The Prince
 Edwige Feuillère: The Duchess
 Philippe Khorsand: The Butler
 in minor roles: Jacques Marchand, Jacques Plee, Robert Deslandes, Jacques Castelot, Francis Rossello and 
 Director: Pierre Boutron
 Stage design: 
 Costumes: 
 Lighting: Boutron
 Music: Poulenc
 First performance on 11 September 1984

References

External links 
 Léocadia : un conte de fées nostalgique on Le Figaro (12 October 2012)
 Léocadia on gallica
 Lectures à une voix – Léocadia de Jean Anouilh (in French) ina.fr
 Programme 1940 regietheatrale.com
 Léocadia, FP 106 (Poulenc, Francis) on IMSLP

1940 plays
Plays by Jean Anouilh